Project Cadmus is a fictional genetic engineering project in the DC Comics Universe. Its notable creations included the Golden Guardian (a clone of the original Guardian), Auron (another clone of the original Guardian), Superboy (Kon-El) (a binary clone made from the DNA of Superman and Lex Luthor), and Dubbilex and his fellow DNAliens. Its 31st-century descendants run the Justice League 3000 clone project.

Publication history
Project Cadmus was created by Jack Kirby as the DNA Project in Superman's Pal Jimmy Olsen #133 (October 1970), and was run by the former Newsboy Legion.

Fictional organization history
Project Cadmus was founded by Dabney Donovan, Reginald Augustine, and Thomas Thompkins. The Cadmus facilities were originally constructed in a large, abandoned aqueduct outside of Metropolis. Exploration soon uncovered a vast array of caverns close to the facilities. These would become important later.

Dabney Donovan was ultimately fired from the Project because he felt there should never be limits in understanding the potential of the genetic code. Donovan had largely been accredited for the non-human creations of the Project, referred to as "DNAliens", various normal clones, and monsters based on Donovan's favorite horror films (who lived on a small artificial planet on Earth called Transilvane). One of the DNAliens named Dubbilex became a prominent staff member.

There are also "step-ups" who call themselves "the Hairies", super hippies who have developed an evolved knowledge-base and developed transport and defense technology beyond the understanding of modern-day humans. The Hairies live outside the direct control of Cadmus, living inside a mobile "Mountain of Judgement" that constantly keeps them hidden from the affairs of both Cadmus and society in general. Prior to moving to the mountain, the Hairies lived in a forest of living tree-houses called the Habitat, which is right outside some of Cadmus' main facilities.

The Project has an "opposite number" in the form of the Evil Factory, a monster-creating project set up by Darkseid as part of Intergang and run by two of his servants called Simyan and Mokkari. They were originally created at Project Cadmus, but due to the cruelty of the experimentation they experienced at the hands of Dr. Dabney Donovan, they develop a great deal of hatred towards all humanity. They form a scientific enclave called "Brigadoom" as a means of pleasing Darkseid by creating an army of monstrous genetic constructs. They are constantly creating entities to assist Darkseid in mastering the Anti-Life Equation, clues of which exist on Earth. This would allow Darkseid and his lackeys like Simyan and Mokkari to rule over their surroundings.

Following the Crisis on Infinite Earths, the Project was reintroduced as Project Cadmus, named after the Greek legend of Cadmus, who created warriors from the teeth of a dragon.

Before creating the DNA Project, Kirby had written a cloning story called "The Cadmus Seed" in Alarming Tales.

The Post-Crisis version made its first appearance in Superman (vol. 2) Annual #2 (1988). It was responsible for the creation of the new Superboy, cloned from genetic material obtained from both Superman and Lex Luthor (originally, the human DNA was identified as that of Project director Paul Westfield). Superboy is subsequently freed by the clones of the Newsboy Legion, who now, as adults, are all working for Cadmus. A clone of Guardian, another long-time hero, works at the facility. As before, another prominent staff member is Dubbilex, a "DNAlien" with telepathic powers.

Cadmus is run for a time by Director Westfield. After Superman's death at the hands of Doomsday, Westfield had Superman's body stolen  and worked upon by the scientists of Cadmus in The Legacy of Superman #1 (1993). After the nearest approximation of his DNA is created, Westfield has a Guardian clone named Auron assault the Newsboy Legion clones and their adult "fathers" in an effort to acquire it. Auron almost kills the clones, causing them to crash land in the Habitat, before his Guardian memories come to the forefront. He takes the only copy of the DNA into space. The adult Legion then openly defy Westfield and ponder quitting Cadmus.

Dabney Donovan, still insane, returns multiple times to plague Cadmus, such as capturing the adult Legion and subjecting them to various torments. He would also ally himself with forces from Apokolips.

Cadmus goes to war with the forces of Lex Luthor in a Superman story called "The Fall of Metropolis". This story features a "clone plague" with many clones becoming sick and even dying. Westfield is killed by Donovan. Cadmus is seemingly destroyed entirely, but the Project had simply taken the opportunity to go underground.

New management
In Superboy (vol. 4) #57, the Project was put under new management, following the Newsboys' retirement. The new project head is Mickey "the Mechanic" Cannon, a former Suicide Slum resident with a reputation for being able to "fix" anything, a car or a country. The new head of genetics is Dr. Serling Roquette, a teenaged genius with a crush on the Guardian and Superboy. Dabney Donovan is also brought back, under armed guard. Cannon made Cadmus more open to the public.

Shortly after this the Project temporarily came under the control of the Evil Factory, now revealed to be part of an organisation called The Agenda. This is run by Lex Luthor's ex-wife, the Contessa. The Agenda concerns itself with cloning for its own purposes. One of its operatives, Amanda Spence murders Superboy's girlfriend Tana Moon. The Agenda suffers setbacks at the hands of multitudes of superheroes, including mutinous superpowered beings from within their own ranks. Other characters form another resistance cell and ultimately defeat the 'Evil Factory'.

Endings
When Luthor becomes President of the United States, Cannon and the Guardian became uncomfortable with the amount of government pressure on the Project. Following the Imperiex War, the entire project vanishes. The abandoned facilities, three miles below Metropolis, are later seen. Lex Luthor (no longer president) and several of his associates have appropriated the buildings for their own uses.

During the Seven Soldiers maxi-series, it is mentioned that Cadmus had shut down and sold off the rights to the Guardian name and likeness to a New York-based newspaper called The Manhattan Guardian. The newspaper ended up using the name and costume to create its own superhero. During 52, Project Cadmus is shown to be still in existence.

It wasn't until Countdown to Final Crisis Week 33 that the Project actually resurfaces, and it is still led by Mickey Cannon. He chases down Jimmy Olsen, eventually offering the boy a chance to work with Cadmus to help Olsen discover the mysteries of his new superpowers. Upon arrival at the Project, Olsen is greeted by Dubbilex and Serling Roquette. Roquette takes Jimmy aside to help him learn about his powers. However, when his powers start going out of control, he flees the Project rather than risk hurting someone.

In the Superman's Pal, Jimmy Olsen one-shot (Dec 2008), Jimmy discovers Cadmus was involved in the creation of Codename: Assassin, and returns to the Project. He discovers the facility abandoned, except for Dubbilex. Dubbilex explains that all the Project's assets have been reassigned by the Government to a new military project with an alien-killing agenda. He tells Jimmy the origin of Codename: Assassin, and asks him to find the Guardian. He then dies of his injuries. In Teen Titans (vol. 3) #83, two married scientists named Vincent and Rochelle Barnes are introduced as Cadmus liaisons to the Titans, and are assigned to help the team track down Raven after she is kidnapped by a demon named Wyld. During the course of the ensuing storyline, Vincent is killed by a possessed Miss Martian. In Teen Titans (vol. 3) #87, Cyborg and Rochelle take Miss Martian and Static to Cadmus Labs after the former is rendered comatose and the latter loses his powers following a battle with Wyld.

Later troubles lead to Cadmus concentrating its power in a Vietnam facility. They take control of the Creature Commandos. The villainous Maxwell Lord is using the resources of Cadmus for his own ends.

The New 52
In 2011, "The New 52" rebooted the DC universe. Project Cadmus is located beneath Cadmus Industries. Kevin Kho worked for Project Cadmus as a genetic researcher under Martin Welman. Kevin's co-workers at Project Cadmus include Tony Jay and Kevin's fiancé Jody Robbins. One day during Kevin Kho's employment, Brother Eye activated Kevin's OMAC side and nearly had him level Cadmus Industries to steal its mainframe. It was also revealed that Mokkari had infiltrated Project Cadmus as a researcher on DeSaad's behalf.

Convergence
During the "Convergence" storyline, the Pre-Zero Hour Superboy has lost his powers shortly after claiming his super-identity. In addition to their support for the Metropolis citizens trapped under the dome, the Pre-Zero Hour Cadmus keeps track of the now-human Superboy who is undergoing deep emotional problems.

Overtaken by Leviathan
Cadmus assets are caught up in a war against worldwide intelligence organizations. Batgirl uncovers evidence that Cadmus has been overtaken by a hostile group calling themselves Leviathan.

Members
 Dubbilex - Modified psychic human-clone under the label "DNAlien".
 Martin Welman - 
 Mickey Cannon - Security Director.
 Jody Robbins - The co-worker and fiancée of Kevin Kho.
 Serling Roquette - Geneticist.
 Tony Jay -

Former members
 Dabney Donovan - insane genetic scientist and former founder. Provided Intergang with weapons and experiments. 
 Amanda Spence - A scientist and the daughter of Paul Westfield.
 Guardian - Head of Security. He was cloned from the original Guardian.
 Kevin Kho - A genetic researcher who is secretly OMAC.
 Master - Robby Reed's villain form previously worked at Project Cadmus and had learned how to make his own supervillains from the cell samples of unnamed humans.
 Mokkari - He infiltrated Project Cadmus on DeSaad's behalf.
 Newsboy Legion -
 Anthony Rodriguez - Scientist.
 John Gabrielli - Scientist.
 Patrick MacGuire -
 Thomas Thompkins - A scientist and co-founder of Project Cadmus.
 Walter Johnson - 
 Paul Westfield - Former Director of Project Cadmus and the father of Amanda Spence. Killed by Dabney Donovan.

Creations of Project Cadmus
 Superboy - A creation of Project Cadmus who created him by splicing the DNA of Superman and Lex Luthor. Escaped the Project Cadmus facility and joined Young Justice and Teen Titans.
 DNAliens - A group of human beings cloned and then genetically altered with the DNA of other lifeforms to discover superhuman potential while also giving them a more "alien" appearance. They have also been called Genetix and Genomorphs. Dubbilex is a known DNAlien.
 Adam - A binary clone of Guardian and Dubbilex.
 Alex - A clone of Dubbilex that was enhanced with Kryptonian DNA.
 Angry Charlie - A DNAlien that befriended Gabby Gabrielli II.
 Auron - A clone of Guardian whose body contains the code for Superman's DNA in light of his apparent death at the hands of Doomsday.
 Black Zero III - A clone of Paul Westfield who comes from a Hypertime stream.
 Gene-Gnome - A DNAlien allied with the Agenda.
 Hairies - A group listed as "Step-Ups" who called themselves "the Hairies", are a group of DNAlien super hippies who developed an evolved knowledge, and developed transport and defense technology beyond the understanding of modern day humans under the leadership of a Hairie named "Jude".
 Outsiders Biker Gang - A group of Hairies who make up an outlaw motorcycle club.
 Yango - Member of the Outsiders Biker Gang.
 Smother - A DNAlien.
 DNAngels - A trio of genetically-engineered female US government agents that were created by Amanda Spence who spliced the DNA samples of different women with the DNA samples of young superheroes. Their creation cost over $2,000,000,000.00.
 Cherub - A clone created from the DNA of Superboy's deceased girlfriend Tana Moon and the DNA of Bart Allen. She possesses super-speed.
 Epiphany - A clone created from the DNA of an unnamed Caucasian woman and the DNA of Wonder Girl. She has the same powers as Wonder Girl and sports fiery wings.
 Seraph - A clone created from the DNA of an unnamed African-American woman and Superboy. She possesses tactile telekinesis.

Other versions

All-Star Superman
In the non-continuity book All-Star Superman, Grant Morrison's modern take on the Silver Age includes the D.N.A. P.R.O.J.E.C.T. which was resurrected by a scientist named Leo Quintum. A comment indicates this organization formed off of the military's 'Cadmus' group. Under Quintum, the P.R.O.J.E.C.T. is dedicated to "the engineering of new human forms" including Bizarro worker drones, giants (Voyager Titans) who can travel through space under their own power, and microscopic "nanonauts" unlocking the mysteries of the sub-atomic world. The P.R.O.J.E.C.T.'s ultimate goal is to create a replacement Superman, in case something happens to the original.

It is revealed that the P.R.O.J.E.C.T. created a formula to bestow Superman-level strength and durability on a normal person, but all of their test subjects ultimately burned out. Marked with "Do Not Open Until Doomsday", Jimmy Olsen injects himself the formula and transforms into a hulking, gray skinned figure with bony protrusions. Jimmy succeeds in stopping a black-kryptonite-affected Superman. Both come through their ordeal, shaken but healthy.

Later, Dr. Quintum's assistant asks him what people will do if Superman never returns from the sun. The last page of the story is a splash-panel of Dr. Quintum replying "I'm sure we'll think of something" and looking at a large, sealed door labeled P.R.O.J.E.C.T. and with a Superman S-shield modified to resemble the number 2.

Batman Beyond
In the Batman Beyond universe, Project Cadmus is still active and run by Amanda Waller, Dr. Thawne and others.

Cadmus One Million
The name "Project Cadmus" has survived to the 853rd century. They have a position of authority over this era's Superboy, who is the one millionth clone of the original. He takes two assignments for them; hunting down the JLA Bizzaro Clone Terrorist and searching for the traces of 20th Century DNA Cadmus had detected. Though Cadmus believed the DNA was in the arctic region on Earth, it was found floating in the Solar System's asteroid belt. It was a humanoid being in a stasis chamber and is later implied the humanoid is Lobo.

Earth-51
This alternate dimension features a Project Cadmus that becomes the focal point of the characters Buddy Blank, Kamandi and Brother Eye.

JLA: The Nail
In the Elseworlds story JLA: The Nail, Cadmus Labs appears as an "Alien Research" testing-ground that holds many metahumans both good and evil. Known captives are Eclipso, Silver Banshee, Firestorm, Hawk and Dove, Creeper, Chemo, Black Orchid, Congo Bill, Man-Bat, Animal Man, Dolphin, Star Sapphire and Freedom Beast.

Justice League 3000
In Justice League 3000, a 31st Century version of Project Cadmus has survived for over a millennium featuring clones of the original Justice League members Superman, Wonder Woman, Batman, Flash and Green Lantern.

In other media

Television

Animation
 Project Cadmus plays a significant role in the DC Animated Universe, first appearing as an adversary of the Justice League in the first season of Justice League Unlimited. This version of the group was created to deal with Superman if he were to attack the Earth, after Darkseid brainwashed him into doing so at the end of Superman: The Animated Series. It would eventually extend to the Justice League following the Justice Lords incident. Additionally, it was originally funded by Lex Luthor, but after he and Brainiac were defeated, Cadmus ceased operations against the League, though still remained active into the future of Batman Beyond, with Waller becoming their liaison. However, there were a few former members of Cadmus who were still against the Justice League. For example, Tala would join Gorilla Grodd's Secret Society whereas General Wade Eiling turned himself into "The General" using Captain Nazi's super-soldier serum.
 Notable members of Cadmus include Amanda Waller, Professor Hamilton, Tala, General Eiling, Professor Milo, Maxwell Lord, Hugo Strange, and Doctor Moon. In addition, they also had Task Force X, a group similar to the Suicide Squad who primarily handle risky field missions. Throughout the organization's appearances, Project Cadmus was responsible for creating the characters Galatea (a clone of Supergirl who resembles Power Girl), Doomsday, the Royal Flush Gang, Volcana, and the Ultimen (a team of genetically engineered heroes who are a parody of several heroes created for the Super Friends series). They have also developed some technology that was not only used to create Terry McGinnis (Batman II) but was also stolen and used by the Joker to overwrite his DNA into Tim Drake and revive himself through him (in Batman Beyond: Return of the Joker).
 Project Cadmus appears in Young Justice, first appearing in the series premiere episode "Independence Day". Project Cadmus is headed up by the seven members of Cadmus' Board of Directors that call themselves "The Light", codenamed L-1 (Vandal Savage), L-2 (Ra's al Ghul), L-3 (Lex Luthor), L-4 (Queen Bee), L-5 (Ocean Master), L-6 (the Brain), and L-7 (Klarion the Witch Boy). According to series creator Greg Weisman, the numbers are based on the order in which they joined the Light. In "Independence Day" and "Fireworks", the Cadmus Building that was seen is run by Dr. Mark Desmond who is served by Dubbilex, Amanda Spence and a brainwashed Guardian. Robin, Aqualad and Kid Flash decide to do some investigating into Project Cadmus although their mentors in the Justice League instructed them to stay out of it while they were fighting Wotan. They fight Dubbilex, Guardian and a group of alien-looking Cadmus creatures called Genomorphs consisting of G-Dwarves (the worker Genomorphs with tentacles), G-Elves (clawed Genomorph warriors), G-Gnomes (small Genomorphs with telepathy), G-Sprites (insect-like Genomorphs that are kept in jars and are capable of generating electricity), G-Trolls (large Genomorphs with super-strength) and G-Goblins (humanoid Genomorphs with telepathy and telekinesis), the only one being Dubbilex. The teen heroes eventually locate a stasis chamber containing Superboy. While making their way to the surface, Robin, Aqualad, Kid Flash and Superboy run into Dubbilex, Guardian and the alien-looking creatures who want their freedom from Mark Desmond. When Mark Desmond turns into Blockbuster, he knocks down Guardian before fighting Robin, Aqualad, Kid Flash and Superboy. After Blockbuster is defeated by Robin, Aqualad, Kid Flash and Superboy and then taken away by some of the Justice League members, Batman states that Cadmus will be investigated. The next day, Guardian becomes the new head of the Cadmus Building but running it in a humane way. The Light wasn't pleased with what happened and vowed to make Robin, Aqualad, Kid Flash and Superboy pay for what happened at one of their Cadmus Buildings. In "Agendas", Superboy meets Lex Luthor in Washington DC who tells him that Project Cadmus has created a new Superclone. Guardian shows Superboy that he has redesigned the Cadmus building since Blockbuster's defeat. Superboy is telepathically told by Dubbilex asking what would happen if he did find a Superclone. After recovering from the Superclone's attack, Superboy learns from Dubbilex that Dr. Mark Desmond and Lex Luthor headed Project Match with the Superclone being the original with full Kryptonian DNA but unstable. Dubbilex telepathically guides Superboy to Genomorph City where the missing Genomorphs are living free and that the Genomorphs have Match telepathically subdued. Match ends up breaking free and attacks Superboy and Dubbilex. Superboy ends up using the patches that Lex Luthor has given him to hold back the human DNA so that he can be on equal grounds with Match. Upon subduing Match, Superboy is ceased from attacking when Guardian and the others show up. With Match on ice in his pod, Guardian states to Superboy that "it has to be this way". In "Auld Acquaintance", Lex Luthor, Brain, Monsieur Mallah, Queen Bee, Ocean Master and Ra's al Ghul infiltrate Project Cadmus and steal the clones that they have including the cryogenic pods holding both Match and the original Roy Harper.

Live action
 The television series Smallville referenced a company called "Cadmus Labs", which Lex Luthor bought from heir Victoria Hardwick. This Cadmus was merely part of a larger plan by Luthor; after it was taken from him in a hostile takeover by Victoria (who pretended to love Lex) and her father Henry, it turned out that the project was a feint. The company was in major financial and legal trouble and so the Hardwicks were financially crippled. It briefly appeared in Season 2 as Steven Hamilton was assigned there by Lex, as well as the arrogant Dr. Frederick Walden. Walden, a linguist was hired by Lex to search the Kawatche Caves in Smallville, believing them to be alien. In Season 10, Cadmus would remain owned by LuthorCorp and secretly develop genetic research in order to create clones of Lex. Lex planned to use these clones to heal his wounds, but was unable due to his apparent death at the hands of Oliver Queen in Season 8. In the first episode of the season, "Lazarus" it was revealed that some clones had been created including a young/LX-15 and elderly version of Lex/LX-3. The young Lex is revealed to be a hybrid clone of Lex Luthor and Clark Kent and is living with Clark Kent in Smallville.
 Project Cadmus is first mentioned in Supergirl in the season one episode "Manhunter". J'onn J'onzz and Alex Danvers discover that Jeremiah Danvers is alive and being held at the facility. It had a longstanding relationship with the government - a major reason why Superman was unwilling to work with Washington. The organization appears as a recurring threat during season two seeking to root out and eliminate all aliens on Earth. The organization is led by Lillian Luthor (the primary antagonist of the second season), mother of Lex Luthor, and the adoptive mother of Lena Luthor. In the season premiere "The Adventures of Supergirl", Cadmus turns John Corben into Metallo. In "The Last Children of Krypton", the organization announces that it has gone rogue, and is no longer working with the government. A mole working for Cadmus is discovered within the DEO. In the episode "Crossfire", a group of criminals are secretly given advanced alien weaponry by Cadmus to further advance their anti-alien agenda. In "Changing", Project Cadmus abducts Mon-El. Kara rescues him, with Jeremiah's help in "The Darkest Place", battling another Cadmus experiment called Cyborg Superman - formerly DEO director Hank Henshaw. The episode "Medusa" sees Cadmus attempt to spread a virus that would kill all alien life, but the plan is thwarted, leading to Lillian Luthor's arrest, until in "Luthors" where she is freed by Hank Henshaw and Corben/Metallo. All three go to a remote facility built by her son to unleash a powerful nuclear weapon to wipe out alien beings in National City; the plan is thwarted by Supergirl and Corben dies in facility while Lillian and Henshaw escape. In the episode "Homecoming", it is revealed that Jeremiah has joined Cadmus as well. After his rescue from Cadmus soldiers, Supergirl and her family celebrate his return, except for Mon-El who is suspicious of him. At the same time Cadmus apparently made a fusion bomb using energy from Supergirl's heat vision in order to frame aliens for dropping it on National City, but it is discovered to be a ruse. Jeremiah (being cybernetically enhanced like Hank) eventually "betrayed" the DEO. He steals a national registry of aliens in preparation to remove all aliens from Earth by using their massive ship, Hoshin Fregate, and exile them on another planet. In "Exodus", Cadmus has already began operation Exodus, kidnapping several aliens as a form of deportation. Supergirl and her friends discover the holding site where Cadmus prepares to launch their ship. Alex Danvers, who went to search for her father, gets in and attempts to rescue them, but the ship automatically launched into space until Supergirl arrived and brought down the ship to Earth, thwarting Cadmus's plans once again. Also, Jeremiah Danvers turns against Cadmus to rescue his daughters and the aliens. He explained to Alex that he had to work for them to protect his daughters, otherwise, they would kill him and his family. In "Resist", Lillian Luthor comes to Supergirl and her team to propose an alliance between her organisation and the DEO to stop a Daxamite invasion on Earth, in addition that her daughter Lena Luthor is captive with them. Supergirl refuses initially, but later changes her mind. Lillian proposes to go to the Fortress of Solitude where the Phantom Zone Projector is held in order to infiltrate Daxamite ship and rescue Lena and Mon-El from Rhea. Kara, Lillian and Hank activate the projector and board the ship to save them. After rescuing them, Lillian and Hank betray Kara and Mon-El to leave them behind while beaming only Lena and themselves to the Fortress. However, Kara expected her betrayal and her friend Winn Schott Jr. put a bug device on Hank prior to the rescue operation. She turns on the device to force him in reactivating the projector to beam Mon-El out of the spaceship. In the season two finale, "Nevertheless, She Persisted", Lillian visits her daughter in her company's building telling her that despite her malevolent acts, she wants to make the world a better place to live and promises to commit herself to improving their relationship, even telling Lena that she could be a Luthor who can save the world. Kara and Kal-El come to their building for help to defeat the Daxamites. Lillian shows them a device from Lex's vault that scatters a toxic substance in the atmosphere (originally filled with Kryptonite, but now with lead). J'onn tells Winn to help Lillian and Lena finish this device despite his reluctance. During the fight between Kara and Rhea in a combat ritual called Dakkam-Ur, Winn and the Luthors finish the device. When the situation gets worse, Lillian hesitates when she wants to turn on the device, but Lena tells her that only Kara can activate it if she loses against Rhea. Kara defeats Rhea and unleashes the lead, poisoning many Daxamites and killing Rhea, while others (including Mon-El) flee into space. In National City's news, it is stated that Cadmus saved the world and wants to establish peace on Earth, but is a potential ruse, implying that Cadmus returned to its old ways. Lillian returns in the season three episode "For Good" where she is aware that her daughter is threatened by Morgan Edge and she tries to kill him in one of Lex Luthor's Lexosuits only to be stopped by Supergirl, Mon-El and Lena. She is arrested along with Morgan Edge. Her arrest results in Cadmus' disbandment. Lillian briefly appears in season four premiere "American Alien" where she is interrogated by Supergirl and Lena about Mercy and Otis Graves who formerly worked for Cadmus, including the business connection between her son and a corrupt businessman/former associate Bruno Mannheim.
 Cadmus Labs appears in the Titans episode "Dick Grayson". Its post-credits scene shows Superboy and Krypto escaping from their Metropolis facility. In season two, Cadmus begins pursuing Superboy with help from Mercy Graves.

Film
 Dr. Leo Quintum's DNA P.R.O.J.E.C.T. appears in the film All-Star Superman (based on the acclaimed series by Grant Morrison).
 Cadmus appeared in the live-action Green Lantern film. At the background when Waller and Hector Hammond enter the top secret DEO facility, a sign appears that said "Cadmus".
 Cadmus appears in Lego DC Super Hero Girls: Super-Villain High.

Video games
 In the cancelled Flash game, Cadmus Soldiers were supposed to have technology that tapped into the "Speed Force" to slow down the Flash, making the soldiers as fast as him.
 Cadmus Labs is involved in Superman Returns: The Video Game. During an interview, the game's executive producer mentioned that among the game's various enemies were "Bizarro's minions escaped from Cadmus Labs".
 Project Cadmus appears in DC Universe Online. In the Area 51 alert, the players encounter Project Cadmus' soldiers led by Mickey Cannon while preventing Brainiac's forces from stealing a piece of Kryptonite that was being held in the Area 51 buildings.
 In the Batman: Arkham City DLC campaign called "Harley's Revenge", CADMUS is mentioned on posters jotted around the Sionis Steel Mill reading "CADMUS LABS. Building a brighter tomorrow".

See also
 List of government agencies in DC Comics

Sources and notes

1970 in comics
Fictional elements introduced in 1970
Fictional intelligence agencies
DC Comics locations
Metropolis (comics)